Dundee Village Historic District is a national historic district located at Dundee in Yates County, New York. Notable buildings include the former school housing the Greater Dundee Historical Society (1891), Dundee State Bank (1901), Baptist Church (1887), and a variety of mid- to late-19th century commercial buildings. The district encompasses 78 contributing buildings and 6 contributing objects in the historic core of Dundee.  It includes the separately listed Dundee Methodist Church and First Presbyterian Church.

It was listed on the National Register of Historic Places in 2007.

References

Historic districts on the National Register of Historic Places in New York (state)
Historic districts in Yates County, New York
National Register of Historic Places in Yates County, New York